Meadowfoam seed oil is a seed oil, extracted from the seeds of Limnanthes alba (meadowfoam). The seeds contain 20-30% oil. Meadowfoam seed oil is extraordinarily stable, primarily because it contains over 98% long chain fatty acids. Meadowfoam oil is most similar to rapeseed oil, with which it competes directly for the high-volume industrial oilseed applications. Meadowfoam oil is widely used in cosmetic and hair-care applications due to its stability, emolliency and smooth, soft skin feel. The oil in its unpurified form is not suitable for human consumption, primarily because of its erucic acid content.

References 

Vegetable oils